Al-Ahli Club Sanaa is a Yemeni football and basketball club based in Sanaa, Yemen. The club was founded in 1952.

Al-Ahli has a fierce rivalry with local rivals Al-Wehda which manifests itself in the Al-Wahda versus Al-Ahli matches, known as "the Summit".

The volleyball team sought to include the player Youssef Jamal and he would have been a strong addition to the club, but the board of directors of the union was changed and a new board of directors was appointed and the negotiations were stopped.

Achievements
Yemeni League: 10
1981, 1983, 1984, 1988, 1992, 1994, 1999, 2000, 2001, 2007

Yemeni President Cup: 3
2001, 2004, 2009

Yemeni Unity Cup: 1
2004

Yemeni Esteghlal Cup: 1
2006

Performance in AFC competitions
 AFC Champions League: 1 appearance
2002–03: Qualifying West – Third Round

 Asian Club Championship: 3 appearances
1990: Qualifying Stage
1994: Qualifying – First round
2001: First Round

AFC Cup: 2 appearances
2008: Group Stage, 4th in group
2010: Group Stage, 4th in group

 Asian Cup Winners Cup: 2 appearances
1991–92: Second Round
1998–99: First Round

References

Football clubs in Yemen
Association football clubs established in 1952
Sport in Sanaa
1952 establishments in Asia
Establishments in the Kingdom of Yemen
Basketball teams in Yemen
Basketball teams established in 1952